Impostora is a Philippine television drama series broadcast by GMA Network. The series is loosely based on the 1993 film, Sa Isang Sulok ng mga Pangarap. It aired from July 3, 2017 to February 9, 2018 on the network's Afternoon Prime line up replacing Legally Blind.

NUTAM (Nationwide Urban Television Audience Measurement) People in Television Homes ratings are provided by AGB Nielsen Philippines. The series ended, but its the 32nd-week run, and with a total of 160 episodes. It was replaced by The Stepdaughters.

Series overview

Episodes

July 2017

August 2017

September 2017

October 2017

November 2017

December 2017

January 2018

February 2018

References

Lists of Philippine drama television series episodes